Bio Oko is a cinema in the Holešovice district of Prague, Czech Republic. Part of a seven-building development between the district's Milada Horáková and Heřmanová streets built between 1937 and 1940, it was designed by Jaroslav Stockar-Bernkopf and Josef Šolc. The cinema is known for its seating options; as well as standard seats, visitors to Bio Oko can sit on sofas, bean bags or deck chairs. The cinema was reopened in October 2007 after a period of reconstruction, with the premiere of the Czech film . Bio Oko switched to digital projection in 2011, thanks to funding from Prague 7 and the Ministry of Culture.

References

External links
Bio Oko at Prague.eu

Cinemas in the Czech Republic
Buildings and structures in Prague
Prague 7
1940 establishments in Czechoslovakia
20th-century architecture in the Czech Republic